Actel Corporation (formerly NASDAQ:ACTL) was an American manufacturer of nonvolatile, low-power field-programmable gate arrays (FPGAs), mixed-signal FPGAs, and programmable logic solutions. It was headquartered in Mountain View, California, with offices worldwide. In November 2010, Actel was acquired by Microsemi for $430 million.

History and competition 
Actel was founded in 1985 and became known for its high-reliability and antifuse-based FPGAs, used in the military and aerospace markets.

In 2000, Actel acquired GateField which expanded Actel's antifuse FPGA offering to include flash-based FPGAs. In 2004, Actel announced it had shipped the one-millionth unit of its flash-based ProASICPLUS FPGA.

In 2005, Actel introduced a new technology known as Fusion to bring FPGA programmability to mixed-signal solutions. Fusion was the first technology to integrate mixed-signal analog capabilities with flash memory and FPGA fabric in a monolithic device.

In 2006, to address the tight power budgets of the portable market, Actel introduced the IGLOO FPGA. The IGLOO family of FPGAs was based on Actel's nonvolatile flash technology and the ProASIC 3 FPGA architecture. Two new IGLOO derivatives were added in 2008: IGLOO PLUS FPGAs with enhanced I/O capabilities, and IGLOO nano FPGAs, a low power solution at 2 µW. A nano version of ProASIC3 also became available in 2008.

In 2010, Actel introduced the SmartFusion line of FPGAs.  SmartFusion includes both analog components and a programmable flash-based logic fabric within the same chip.  SmartFusion was the first FPGA product to additionally include a hard ARM processor core.

Altera and Xilinx are the other key players in the market, however their main focus is on SRAM FPGAs. Lattice Semiconductor is another competitor.

Technologies 
Actel's portfolio of FPGAs is based on two types of technologies: antifuse-based FPGAs (Axcelerator, SX-A, eX, and MX families) and flash-based FPGAs (Fusion, PolarFire, IGLOO, and ProASIC3 families).

Actel's antifuse FPGAs have been known for their nonvolatility, live at power-up operation, single-chip form factor, and security. Actel's flash-based FPGA families include these same characteristics and are also reprogrammable and low power.

Actel also develops system-critical FPGAs (RTAX and ProASIC3 families), including extended temperature automotive, military, and aerospace FPGAs, plus a wide variety of space-class radiation-tolerant devices. These flash and antifuse FPGAs have high levels of reliability and firm-error immunity.

Controversy 
In March 2012, researchers from Cambridge University discovered that a backdoor exists in the JTAG interface of the ProASIC3 family of low-powered FPGAs. They defended their theory at a cryptography workshop held in Belgium in September 2012.

References

External links 

 Corporate website

Defunct semiconductor companies of the United States
Electronic design automation companies
Fabless semiconductor companies
Technology companies based in the San Francisco Bay Area
Companies based in Mountain View, California
American companies established in 1985
Electronics companies established in 1985
Electronics companies disestablished in 2010
1985 establishments in California
2010 disestablishments in California
Companies formerly listed on the Nasdaq
Defunct manufacturing companies based in the San Francisco Bay Area
2010 mergers and acquisitions